Christopher John Davison (born 15 October 1948), known professionally as Chris de Burgh, is a British-Irish singer-songwriter and instrumentalist. He started out as an art rock performer, but subsequently started writing more pop-oriented material. He has had several top 40 hits in the UK and two in the US, but he is more popular in other countries, particularly Norway and Brazil. His 1986 love song "The Lady in Red" reached number one in several countries. De Burgh has sold over 45 million albums worldwide.

Early life
De Burgh was born in Venado Tuerto, Argentina, to Colonel Charles John Davison, a British diplomat, and Maeve Emily (née de Burgh). His maternal grandfather was Sir Eric de Burgh, a British Army officer who had been Chief of the General Staff in India during the Second World War. He took his mother's maiden name, "de Burgh", as a stage name when he began performing, while his legal surname remains "Davison". His father had substantial farming interests, and Chris spent much of his early years in Malta, Nigeria and Belgian Congo, as he, his mother and brother accompanied Colonel Davison on his diplomatic and engineering work.

The Davisons finally settled in Bargy Castle, County Wexford, Ireland, which was somewhat dilapidated at the time. It was a twelfth-century castle which Eric de Burgh bought in the 1960s. He converted it into a hotel, and young Chris sang for the guests there.

De Burgh attended Marlborough College in Wiltshire, England, where he was in the year below Nick Drake; de Burgh asked to join a jazz band Drake had formed with four schoolmates, the Perfumed Gardeners, but was rejected as his taste was "too poppy". De Burgh went on to graduate from Trinity College Dublin, with a Master of Arts degree in French, English and History.

Musical career

Early career
Chris de Burgh signed his first contract with A&M Records in 1974, and supported Supertramp on their Crime of the Century tour, building himself a small fan base. His début album, Far Beyond These Castle Walls, was a folk-tinged stab at fantasy in the tradition of the Moody Blues. It failed to chart upon its release in late 1974. A few months later, he released a single called "Turning Round" from the album, released outside the UK and Ireland as "Flying". It failed to make an impression in the UK, but it stayed on top of the Brazilian charts for 17 weeks. This became a familiar pattern for the singer/songwriter, as every one of his 1970s albums failed to chart in the UK or US while they racked up big sales in continental European and South American countries.

In 1975 his second album, Spanish Train and Other Stories, was released. Whilst (again) not a huge commercial success, the album and tour expanded the fan base, with de Burgh starting to attract a cult following. Along with the epic title track, other fan favourite tracks from the album included "Patricia The Stripper" and "A Spaceman Came Travelling" (the latter released the following year as a single).

1977's third album, At the End of a Perfect Day, whilst well received and featuring both former Fairport Convention drummer Dave Mattacks and later Fairport drummer Gerry Conway, failed to push de Burgh's career significantly, leading to the release of his fourth album Crusader in 1979. Crusader took a more electric direction, including guitar contributions from Ian Bairnson (formerly of Pilot), bass player David Paton (also of Pilot), and drummer Stuart Elliott (formerly of both Cockney Rebel and of Steve Harley and Cockney Rebel), all of whom were also working, at the time, with Kate Bush. The album also featured Sky keyboard player Francis Monkman and Mike Moran. Whilst it attracted a significant number of new fans, Crusader still failed to break through in the UK and US. 1980's Eastern Wind also failed to build further on the (still cult) following in the major territories.

International success
In 1981, de Burgh had his first UK chart entry with Best Moves, a collection culled from his early albums. It set the stage for 1982's Rupert Hine produced The Getaway, which reached number 30 in the UK charts and number 43 in the US, thanks to the eerie single "Don't Pay the Ferryman".

In 1984, Chris de Burgh's follow-up album, Man on the Line, also performed well, charting at 69 in the US and 11 in the UK (topping the charts in Germany and Switzerland); its first single "High on Emotion" became an international success, reaching the Top 20 in several countries (entering notably the Top 5 in Ireland, France and Switzerland) and the Top 50 in both the UK and US.

Chris de Burgh had an across-the-board hit single with the ballad "The Lady in Red" in late 1986; the song became a number one hit in the UK (number three in America) and a worldwide success, its accompanying album, Into the Light, reached number two in the UK (number 25 in the U.S.). That Christmas season, a re-release of de Burgh's 1976 Christmas song "A Spaceman Came Travelling" became a Top 40 hit in the UK.

Flying Colours, his follow-up to Into the Light, entered the British charts at number one upon its 1988 release, yet it failed to make the American charts. De Burgh has not had another hit in the US and his commercial fortunes began to slide in Britain in the early 1990s, yet he retained a following around the world. This is mainly due to inactivity of his previous recording label A&M Records UK division in the U.S.

In 1997 de Burgh composed a song entitled "There's a New Star Up in Heaven Tonight", dedicated to Diana, Princess of Wales. The song was released as a 100-copy limited edition and included on the compilations The Ultimate Collection (2000) and Now and Then (2009).

2007–present
In 2007 a concert in Tehran was planned for mid-2008, together with local band Arian, which would have made Chris de Burgh the first western pop singer to perform in Iran since the 1979 revolution. However, the concert never went ahead because he had not been given permission by the Iranian authorities to perform in the country.

In 2008, de Burgh released Footsteps, his seventeenth album including cover versions of thirteen songs that inspired him throughout his career, by artists like Bob Dylan, the Beatles, Toto and Pete Seeger; the album reached the Top 5 in UK. In 2011, de Burgh released his follow-up, Footsteps 2, which entered the UK Top 40.

He was the first Western act to play in Lebanon after the Lebanese Civil War.

On his 73rd Birthday on 15 October 2021, Chris de Burgh released a music video for his single "Legacy" directed by Iranian filmmaker/animator, Sam Chegini, an animated music video for his 27th studio album, The Legend of Robin Hood.

Personal life
Chris de Burgh has been married to his wife Diane since 1977 and lives in Enniskerry, County Wicklow, in Ireland, having moved there from Dalkey, Dublin, in 1997. They have two sons, Hubie and Michael, and a daughter, Rosanna, best known as the winner of the Miss World competition in 2003 for Ireland. His second cousin, Danny Kinahan of Castle Upton, served as Member of Parliament for South Antrim between 2015 and 2017.

In 1994 he was found to have had an affair with his children's 19-year-old Irish nanny, Maresa Morgan, who was assisting the family while de Burgh's wife Diane was recuperating in the hospital from a broken neck suffered during a horse-riding accident. De Burgh later said he felt very guilty about the affair and subsequently reconciled with his wife.

In 2011 bottles from de Burgh's vintage wine cellar sold for over $500,000, including a world record set for a magnum collection of postwar vintages.

De Burgh has a noted interest in war history, especially that of the First and Second World Wars. His songs contain numerous references to soldiers and battle, and in 2006 he purchased a rare First World War letter written by an unknown soldier.

De Burgh has said that he is "certainly a believer in Christ", but he has always had a deep distrust of organized religion. De Burgh believes in the power of spiritual healing as an alternative therapy to reduce pain. He claims that he has been able to heal people with his own hands and that he gained an "all-encompassing strength" that was contacted through prayer.

Media profile
During the 1970s, de Burgh received mainly positive feedback from the music press, as he attempted to build his career. However, since the release of "The Lady in Red", in 1986, both the music and news media have become significantly more negative towards him, both personally and professionally.

De Burgh has pursued and won 16 defamation actions. The Irish Independent said he has always been a bit prickly about criticism. Peter Crawley, a theatre reviewer at The Irish Times, received a directed response from de Burgh when he wrote a less than sympathetic review of de Burgh's show in Dublin's Gaiety Theatre in September 2009. Crawley wrote: "He departs the stage for 'Lady in Red', invading boxes and draping himself over audience members ... Certain toes will never uncurl after this experience, but it is almost admirable how unaltered de Burgh has remained by the flow of time." In a lengthy, much-publicised reply to the critic, de Burgh made his feelings known, particularly in the postscript:

AllMusic critic Greg Prato has stated: "Depending on who you ask, Chris de Burgh either specializes in pretentious, bombastic art rock disguised as pop or is a master of penning soaring and majestic compositions." The BBC has said of de Burgh: "To his millions of fans, Chris de Burgh is the ultimate romantic singer. But to many others he's a figure of fun." When the staff of Melody Maker were putting together a lampoon edition of a new arts and music magazine, they chose de Burgh for the cover. His signature song, "The Lady in Red", has been repeatedly voted one of the public's most disliked songs. In 2006, Neil Norman, writing for The Independent, described de Burgh as "the world's naffest balladeer". In his favour, Mike DeGagne, writing for AllMusic, has acclaimed de Burgh as "a genuine master of the soft ballad" and "one of the finest mood-invoking artists ever".

Awards and nominations
{| class="wikitable sortable plainrowheaders" 
|-
! scope="col" | Award
! scope="col" | Year
! scope="col" | Nominee(s)
! scope="col" | Category
! scope="col" | Result
! scope="col" class="unsortable"| 
|-
! scope="row"|ASCAP Pop Music Awards
| 1988
| "The Lady in Red"
| Most Performed Song
| 
|

Discography

Studio albums
Far Beyond These Castle Walls (1974)
Spanish Train and Other Stories (1975)
At the End of a Perfect Day (1977)
Crusader (1979)
Eastern Wind (1980)
The Getaway (1982)
Man on the Line (1984)
Into the Light (1986)
Flying Colours (1988)
Power of Ten (1992)
This Way Up (1994)
Quiet Revolution (1999)
Timing Is Everything (2002)
The Road to Freedom (2004)
The Storyman (2006)
Footsteps (2008)
Moonfleet & Other Stories (2010)
Footsteps 2 (2011)
Home (2012)
The Hands of Man (2014)
A Better World (2016)
The Legend of Robin Hood (2021)

Filmography
The Grand Knockout Tournament (1987) (as Himself)
How to Cheat in the Leaving Certificate (1998) (as Petrol Pumper)
The Bachelor S26 E07 (2022) (as Himself)

References

External links

Official website
Official record store and merchandise site
 

Audio interview at BBC Wiltshire
Interview with Akira The Don

1948 births
20th-century British male musicians
21st-century British male musicians
20th-century Irish male singers
21st-century Irish musicians
Alumni of Trinity College Dublin
A&M Records artists
Art rock musicians
British pop singers
British male singer-songwriters
Irish pop singers
Living people
Musicians from County Wexford
People educated at Marlborough College
People from General López Department
20th-century British male singers
21st-century British male singers